John Thompson (3 March 1959) is a former professional rugby league footballer who played in the 1970s, 1980s and 1990s.

Playing career
Thompson made his début for Wakefield Trinity during December 1978, during his time at Wakefield Trinity he scored eleven 3-point tries, and eleven 4-point tries.

County Cup Final appearances
Thompson played right-, i.e. number 10, in Wakefield Trinity's 8–11 defeat by Castleford in the 1990 Yorkshire County Cup Final during the 1990–91 season at Elland Road, Leeds on Sunday 23 September 1990.

Notable tour matches
Thompson played , and was sent off in Wakefield Trinity's 18–36 defeat by Australia in the 1990 Kangaroo tour of Great Britain and France tour match during the 1990–91 season at Belle Vue, Wakefield on Wednesday 10 October 1990.

Testimonial match
John Thompson's Testimonial match at Wakefield Trinity took place in 1988.

References

1959 births
Living people
English rugby league players
Place of birth missing (living people)
Rugby league hookers
Rugby league props
Rugby league second-rows
Wakefield Trinity players
York Wasps players